Odontocera quiinaphila is a species of beetle in the family Cerambycidae.

References

Odontocera
Beetles described in 2003